Kozlovo is a rural locality (a village) in Nikiforovskoye Rural Settlement, Ustyuzhensky District, Vologda Oblast, Russia. The population was 12 as of 2002.

Geography 
Venitsy is the nearest rural locality.

References 

Rural localities in Ustyuzhensky District